G.D. College is a arts and sciences college in Shaikhpara, in the state of West Bengal in India.

History 
G. D. College, certified as having minority status educational institution, is affiliated to the University of Kalyani. It has started its journey on academic session 2014-2015. G.D.College is especially destined to spread education among rural and urban students belonging to minority and backward classes, but generally, its door is open to all students willing to pursue higher education. Late Alhaj Joyed Ali, a well known social worker residing at the same locality where the College is established, firstly visions to start a College of undergraduate courses to provide the poor students of the surrounding areas with opportunities of pursuing higher education. Jahangir Fakir, a spirited young man with noble mission dedicates himself to this vision. G.D.College is the result of his untiring effort and open handed donation of land and fund.

Department

Science

CHEMISTRY
PHYSICS
MATHEMATICS
ENVIRONMENTAL SCIENCE
GEOGRAPHY
ECONOMICS (GEN)

Arts
ARABIC
BENGALI
ENGLISH
HISTORY
ISLAMIC HISTORY
PHILOSOPHY
POLITICAL SCIENCE
SANSKRIT
PHYSICAL EDUCATION (GEN)
SOCIOLOGY (GEN) 
EDUCATION

See also

References

External links 

University of Kalyani
University Grants Commission
National Assessment and Accreditation Council

Universities and colleges in Murshidabad district
Colleges affiliated to University of Kalyani
Educational institutions established in 2007
2007 establishments in West Bengal